Sedeh (also known as Sehdeh) is a city and capital of Sedeh District, in Eqlid County, Fars Province, Iran. At the 2006 census, its population was 5,572, in 1,497 families.

It is on the historical route taken by Alexander the Great in 331 BC between the Persian Gates and Persepolis.

References

Populated places in Eqlid County
Cities in Fars Province